A disruptive physician is a physician whose obnoxious behaviour upsets patients or other staff.  The American Medical Association defines this in their code of medical ethics as "personal conduct, whether verbal or physical, that negatively affects or that potentially may affect patient care". These behaviors are also noted as causing adverse effects such as morale, focus and concentration, team work, collaboration and communication. Starting in 2009, The Joint Commission which accredits hospitals in the United States requires them to have a written code of conduct addressing this issue. This code of conduct defines acceptable, disruptive, and unacceptable behavior in the workplace. Along with these definitions of behaviors the Joint Commission also wrote ways to manage these behaviors in order to fix them.

Simon Sebag Montefiore has reported a remarkable tendency for doctors to become tyrannical dictators.  Historical examples include:

 Bashar al-Assad
 Hastings Banda
 François "Papa Doc" Duvalier
 Félix Houphouët-Boigny
 Radovan Karadžić
 William Walker

See also
Bullying in medicine
Doc Martin
Medical drama
Medical malpractice
The No Asshole Rule

References

Jacob DeLaRosa. The Disruptive Physician, How to Manage the Consequences of Being You Misner & Monroe, New York 2017

Further reading

Deviance (sociology)
Medical ethics
Physicians
Workplace bullying